Hilde Fuchs was an Austrian luger who competed in the early 1980s. A natural track luger, she won the silver medal in the women's singles event at the 1982 FIL World Luge Natural Track Championships in Feld am See, Austria.

References
Natural track World Championships results: 1979-2007

Austrian female lugers
Living people
Year of birth missing (living people)
20th-century Austrian women